Piotr Szulczewski (born 1981) is a Polish businessman and computer engineer who is the founder and former CEO of the mobile-first ecommerce platform focused on low-cost goods, Wish.com. He is the youngest billionaire from Canada according to Forbes.

Early life and background
Szulczewski grew up in the Warsaw neighborhood of Tarchomin. He studied mathematics and computer science at the University of Waterloo, where he met Danny Zhang.

Just before graduating from the University of Waterloo in 2004 at the age of 23, Szulczewski relocated to Palo Alto, California  and commenced a four-month internship coding for Google. He then became a full-time employee for Google, where he wrote the prototype algorithms for keyword expansion, a feature which aids in searching for products from advertisers.

Career
In June 2007, Szulczewski moved to South Korea to work in the new Google office. The Korean market demanded more detailed search portals than the minimalist ones used by Google in the West, and effectively trained Szulczewski in how to cater for the public.

In 2009, he saved enough money to leave Google and spent six months at home writing code for an ads recommendation platform that analyzed at a person's browsing behaviors to predict their interests. He set up a software company, ContextLogic, that in September 2010 received $1.7 million in investments and involved Yelp CEO Jeremy Stoppelman. Jerry Yang, the cofounder of Yahoo! and an investor in Wish through his angel fund, AME Cloud Ventures, recalls that Szulczewski was highly ambitious. In May 2011, Szulczewski invited his old friend Danny Zhang, then at Yellowpages.com to join the new business as a cofounder and they relaunched the company as Wishwall.me. Facebook learned of the new technology and offered $20 million for ContextLogic but Szulczewski refused the offer. Szulczewski states that with Wish.com his primary aim is to create "the largest, most convenient and most affordable shopping mall in the world" and to target low-income households. By 2016 Wish.com had over 5 million daily visitors.

In 2016, Szulczewski was listed at #21 on America's Richest Entrepreneurs Under 40 list and in 2019, #1605 on Forbes's list of Billionaires. In 2019 he was cited as the 34th wealthiest person and youngest billionaire from Canada, and the 5th wealthiest Polish billionaire. Despite his success, he stays out of the spotlight and rarely gives interviews. He was interviewed for the first time by the Polish media in November 2017.

In November 2021, it was announced that Szulczewski would be stepping down as Chief Executive Officer. On January 31, 2022, Vijay Talwar was named as Chief Executive Officer and a member of Wish’s Board of Directors, effective February 1, 2022. Szulczewski  remained on the board.

References

Polish computer programmers
Polish billionaires
Canadian computer businesspeople
Canadian technology chief executives
Canadian technology company founders
Canadian computer programmers
Polish emigrants to Canada
Canadian billionaires
1981 births
Living people
Businesspeople from Warsaw